Hana Kordová Marvanová (born 26 November 1962) is a Czech lawyer and politician, former Vice Chairwoman of the Chamber of Deputies of the Parliament of the Czech Republic.

In 2018 she was elected to the Prague City Council as a non-party member of the STAN movement (Mayors and Independents), and a Councillor and a Commissioner for Legislation, Public Administration and Housing Support. In 2014 she briefly served as the deputy to the Minister of Justice, Helena Válková.

From 1990 to 1998 and again from 2002 to 2003 she was a member of the Czech Parliament in the Chamber of Deputies, representing initially the Civic Forum, later ODS and the Freedom Union (US-DEU). From 2001 to 2002 she was the chairwoman of the US-DEU and in 2002 briefly a deputy Chairwoman of the Chamber of Deputies.

She is the founder of several activist organizations and initiatives, eg., the Independent Peace Association or the Public Against Corruption initiative.

Prior to 1989, during the communist regime, she was a dissident and for several months prior to Czech Velvet revolution also a political prisoner.

References

External links 

Members of the Chamber of Deputies of the Czech Republic (2002–2006)
Civic Democratic Party (Czech Republic) MPs
Freedom Union – Democratic Union MPs
Leaders of the Freedom Union – Democratic Union
20th-century Czech women politicians
21st-century Czech women politicians
20th-century Czech lawyers
21st-century Czech lawyers
Czech women lawyers
Charles University alumni
1962 births
Living people
People from Rýmařov